The Shanghai–Nanjing–Hefei high-speed railway (上海至南京至合肥高速铁路), also known as North Riverside high-speed railway (北沿江高铁), is a high-speed railway line currently under construction in China. It is part of Shanghai–Chongqing–Chengdu high-speed railway.

History 
Construction of Jiangsu Province section of the railway started on 28 September 2022. Construction of Anhui Province section of the railway started on 31 October 2022.

Stations

References 

High-speed railway lines in China
High-speed railway lines under construction